Deh-e Ali Morad (also Romanized as Deh-e ‘Alī Morād; also known as ‘Alī Morād) is a village in Dust Mohammad Rural District, in the Central District of Hirmand County, Sistan and Baluchestan Province, Iran. At the 2006 census, its population was 487, in 108 families.

References 

Populated places in Hirmand County